Marc Ongley (born 13 December 1952) is an Australian classical and jazz guitarist, composer, and teacher. He has lived in the United Kingdom since 1991. Born in Maitland, New South Wales, he became the first Australian to be awarded the Licentiate of the Trinity College of Music, London (LTCL) and the Fellowship of the Trinity College of Music London (FTCL), in 1974 and 1977 respectively.  The Sydney Morning Herald described Ongley as "one of Australia's finest classical guitarists". Ongley studied with the renowned Australian music educator Don Andrews and famous classical guitarists Alirio Diaz and Turibio Santos, students of Andrés Segovia. He recorded and released several classical and jazz albums throughout the 1980s and 1990s. More recently, Ongley released albums in the genres of blues and rock.

Career 
Marc Ongley started his career as a rock guitarist in the band Maya, from Newcastle, New South Wales. The group was an opening act for the Beach Boys at two concerts during their 1970 tour of Australia. Maya finished fourth in Hoadley's Battle of the Sounds in 1970 at the Capitol Theatre, Sydney.

Ongley's first transcription for solo guitar was published in 1973 by J. Albert and Son, an interpretation of Ludwig van Beethoven's "Für Elise".

In 1979 Ongley performed for the Australian High Commissioner, Gordon Freeth, at Australia House, London, playing the piece "Cello Suite No.1" by Johann Sebastian Bach. His first public professional performance in the UK took place on 6 September 1981 at the Wigmore Hall, London. This concert received attention in the Australian press. The Sydney Morning Herald noted that "Australia, with a few exceptions such as John Williams, is not known for its classical guitarists" and therefore it was a "high honour" for Ongley to perform at the Wigmore Hall.

In 1993 Ongley collaborated with British trumpeter Steve Waterman and bass player Laurence Cottle to release his first jazz record, Song for Ros, recorded at Abbey Road Studios on 24 April 1993. Gramophone reviewed the record, writing that "Ongley is a young...guitarist who plays clean, inventive lines with gentle good taste and minimum amplification". The review went on to recognize "Ongley's most welcome new talent". The 1994 edition of The Penguin Guide to Jazz on CD rated the album 3 stars, describing Ongley as "a decent writer in a romantic vein. The title piece and 'My Funny Valentine' are both nice performances, but he's probably at his best in a medium tempo...Respectably produced as well".

Education 
Ongley gained a Licentiate (1974) and Fellowship (1977) in the discipline of music, awarded in Sydney by an international examiner from the Trinity College of Music, London. He studied with Don Andrews and two renowned students of Andrés Segovia: Alirio Diaz and Turibio Santos.

Discography 
 Song for Ros (1993, Hunter Valley # HVRCD0040)
 Guitar Recital (1998, Natural Light # NLR01)
 Jazz Beatles (1999, Natural Light # NLRCD03)
 Golden Classics (2000, Natural Light # NLRCD04)
 Marc Ongley Plays Stevie Wonder (2002, Natural Light # NLRCD05)
 A Day at Abbey Road (2004, Natural Light # NLR CD06)
 The Awakening (2008, Natural Light # NLRCD08)
 The Girl From Ipanema: Latin American Guitar (2014, Natural Light # NLRCD10)

Books 
 Guitar for Everyone Book 1 (London: Natural Light, 2000).
 Rock 'n' Blues: Guitar for Everyone (London, Natural Light, 2000).
 Guitar for Everyone Book 2 (London: Natural Light, 2001).
 Guitar for Everyone Book 3 (London: Natural Light, 2001).
 Guitar for Everyone: First Steps 5yrs + (London: Natural Light, 2006).

References

External links 
 Rate Your Music Discography
WorldCat: Publications

1952 births
Living people
Australian classical guitarists
Australian male guitarists
Australian jazz guitarists
Australian male composers
Australian composers
Male jazz musicians